Justice Yatindra Singh is a former Chief Justice of the Chhattisgarh High Court. He took oath on 22 October 2012. He was born in 1952. He had completed his graduation from Allahabad University in 1970. He has also served as Additional Advocate General of Uttar Pradesh between March 1997 and February 1999.  He retired on 14 October 2014. He has written two books entitled Cyberlaws & A Lawyer's World and Childhood dreams.

References 

Living people
Judges of the Chhattisgarh High Court
Chief Justices of Chhattisgarh High Court
20th-century Indian judges
Year of birth missing (living people)